In graph theory, a -bounded family  of graphs is one for which there is some function  such that, for every integer  the graphs in  with  (clique number) can be colored with at most  colors. This concept and its notation were formulated by András Gyárfás. The use of the Greek letter chi in the term -bounded is based on the fact that the chromatic number of a graph  is commonly denoted .

Nontriviality
It is not true that the family of all graphs is -bounded.
Thus, -boundedness is a nontrivial concept, true for some graph families and false for others.

Specific classes
Every class of graphs of bounded chromatic number is (trivially) -bounded, with  equal to the bound on the chromatic number. This includes, for instance, the planar graphs, the bipartite graphs, and the graphs of bounded degeneracy. Complementarily, the graphs in which the independence number is bounded are also -bounded, as Ramsey's theorem implies that they have large cliques.

This can be seen by using Ramsey's theorem to show that, in these graphs, a vertex with many neighbors must be part of a large clique.
This bound is nearly tight in the worst case, but connected claw-free graphs that include three mutually-nonadjacent vertices have even smaller chromatic number, .

Other -bounded graph families include:
The perfect graphs, with 
The graphs of boxicity two, which is the intersection graphs of axis-parallel rectangles, with (big O notation)
The graphs of bounded clique-width
The intersection graphs of scaled and translated copies of any compact convex shape in the plane
The polygon-circle graphs, with 
The outerstring graph is an intersection graph of curves that lie in a common half-plane and have one endpoint on the boundary of that half-plane
The intersection graphs of curves that cross a fixed curve between 1 and  times

However, although intersection graphs of convex shapes, circle graphs, and outerstring graphs are all special cases of string graphs, the string graphs themselves are not -bounded.
They include as a special case the intersection graphs of line segments, which are also not -bounded.

Unsolved problems

According to the Gyárfás–Sumner conjecture, for every tree , the graphs that do not contain  as an induced subgraph are -bounded. 
For instance, this would include the case of claw-free graphs, as a claw is a special kind of tree.
However, the conjecture is known to be true only for certain special trees, including paths and radius-two trees.

A strong counterexample to Esperet's conjecture was announced in 2022 by Briański, Davies, and Walczak, who proved that there exist -bounded hereditary classes whose function  can be chosen arbitrarily as long as it grows more quickly than a certain cubic polynomial.

References

External links
Chi-bounded, Open Problem Garden

Graph coloring